One of a Kind is the twelfth album by the country singer Moe Bandy, recorded at Jack Clements Studio and CBS Recording Studio, Nashville, Tennessee, and released in 1979 on the Columbia label.

Track listing
"I Cheated Me Right Out of You" (Bobby P. Barker) - 3:02
"One of a Kind" (Sonny Throckmorton, Bobby Fischer) - 2:11
"Gonna Honky Tonk Right Out on You" (H. Mundy) - 2:09
"The Bitter with The Sweet*" (Jim Mundy) - 3:01
"We Start The Fire (But Somebody Else Puts It Out)" (Jim Mundy) - 2:24
"In The Middle of Losing You" (Glenn Martin, Terry Henry) - 2:38
"Tell Her It's Over" (Glenn Martin) - 2:50
"Sweet Kentucky Woman" (Harlan Howard) - 2:49
"Honky Tonk Merry Go Round" (Pearly Mitchell, Pat Bunch) - 2:57
"Man of Means" (Herb McCullough) - 1:59

Musicians
Bob Moore
Buddy Harman
Leo Jackson
Chip Young
Weldon Myrick 
Jimmy Capps
Charlie McCoy (Courtesy of Monument Records)
Johnny Gimble 
Hargus "Pig" Robbins (Courtesy of Elektra Records)
Tommy Allsup
Kenny Malone
Billy Sanford
Hayward Bishop

Backing
The Jordanaires
The Nashville Edition
Janis Carnes

Production
Sound engineers - Ron Reynolds, Billy Sherrill
Photography - Beverly Parker
Art direction - Virginia Team

Moe Bandy albums
1979 albums
Columbia Records albums
Albums produced by Ray Baker (music producer)